Glenwood Cemetery, formerly Georgia Cemetery, is a historic cemetery for African American burials founded in c. 1870 on Hall Avenue in Huntsville, Alabama. Burials include veterans, local politicians, and community leaders

History
Established in c. 1870, Glenwood Cemetery succeeded a burial ground for enslaved African Americans which was north of where a hospital is now and covered by a parking lot. Recognized as a site of historical significance, a historical marker commemorates its history. A local teacher and her students have helped catalogue some of its history. About 10 acres in size, the cemetery is believed to hold between 8,000 and 10,000 burial sites. Many of them are unmarked. 

The cemetery and a headstone for Burgess E. Scruggs, the first licensed doctor in Alabama has been added to the Alabama State Historic Cemetery Register. The Glenwood Cemetery became part of the African American Civil Rights Network in February 2021.

Burials
 Burgess E. Scruggs, doctor and alderman in Huntsville
 Charles Hendley Jr., editor of the Huntsville Gazette
 Henry C. Binford, educator
 Daniel S. Brandon, alderman
 William H. Gaston, religious leader
 C. C. Moore, post office employee

References

Cemeteries in Alabama
African-American cemeteries
1870 establishments in Alabama
Huntsville, Alabama